L'Île Mysterieuse / La Isla misteriosa y el capitán Nemo / Die Geheimnisvolle Insel (The Mysterious Island) is a 1973 Spanish-language Italian-Spanish-French-Cameroonian adventure film adapted from Jules Verne's 1875 novel L'Île mystérieuse. This version was directed by Juan Antonio Bardem and Henri Colpi and featured Omar Sharif as Captain Nemo. It was recut from a TV series of the same year.

Plot

Shipwrecked soldiers are stranded on an island along with their dog, They discover many dangers on the island and retreat to the safety of a cave which they use as a home base. In addition, they save another shipwreck victim from a near-by island.

The group are successful in fending off a group off pirates. although the pirates do shoot the group's pet chimpanzee. The soldiers find a grotto containing Captain Nemo and the Nautilus. Nemo explains how he came to be at the island to the group

A volcano begins to destroy the island, and while the soldiers manage to escape, Nemo opts to go down with his ship.

Production

The film was unusually faithful to the original book, including the exterior design of the Nautilus. Deviations from the original book were either limited to budget restrictions or moderate artistic liberty. While it seems not credible that the Nemo of the book achieved various physically demanding stunts (considering he was weakened and subsequently dying of old age), Omar Sharif is much younger, relies on what's left of his crew (killed by some kind of disease, most likely radiation poisoning) and eventually shares the same fate as his counterpart James Mason in the 1954 Disney version of 20,000 Leagues Under the Sea.

Cast
 Omar Sharif: Captain Nemo
 Gérard Tichy: Cyrus Smith
 Philippe Nicaud: Gédéon Spilett
 Ambroise Bia: Nab (Nabuchodonosor dit)
 Jess Hahn: Bonaventure Pencroff
 Rafael Bardem Jr.: Harbert Brown
 Gabriele Tinti: Ayrton
 Mariano Vidal Molina: Bob Harvey
 Rik Battaglia: Finch

Reception
Roger Ebert awarded the film one and a half stars finding it nihilistic and lacking any decent effects. It also noted Omar Sharif is listed as the star although he is only onscreen for ten minutes. Creature Feature gave the movie 2 out of 5 stars, finding it lacking imagination or interesting special effects.

References

External links
 
 

1973 films
1973 television films
Spanish television miniseries
Italian television miniseries
1970s Spanish television series
1970s French television series
1970s Italian television series
1970s French television miniseries
Spanish adventure films
French adventure films
Italian adventure films
Films based on The Mysterious Island
1970s Spanish-language films
1970s science fiction films
1973 Spanish television series debuts
1973 Spanish television series endings
1973 French television series debuts
1973 French television series endings
1973 Italian television series debuts
1973 Italian television series endings
Spanish science fiction television series
French science fiction television series
Italian science fiction television series
Television shows based on French novels
Films scored by Gianni Ferrio
Television shows based on works by Jules Verne
1970s Italian films
1970s French films